Admiral Dot (1859 or 1863 – October 28, 1918), born Leopold S. Kahn, was a dwarf performer for P. T. Barnum.

Biography
He was born in 1859  or 1863 in San Francisco to Gabriel Kahn and his wife Caroline. His mother had given birth to ten children, of which three survived. His two dwarf brothers were known as Major Atom and General Pin (born 1881).  Their mother was declared insane and jailed after trying to drown General Pin when he was two years old. Barnum wrote: "During the week we spent in seeing San Francisco and its suburbs [in 1869], I discovered a dwarf more diminutive than General Tom Thumb was when first I found him, and so handsome, well-formed and captivating, that I could not resist the temptation to engage him. I gave him the soubriquet of Admiral Dot, dressed him in complete Admiral's uniform, and invited the editors of the San Francisco journals to visit him in the parlours of the Cosmopolitan Hotel. Immediately there was an immense furore, and Woodward's Gardens, where "Dot" was exhibited for three weeks before going east, was daily thronged with crowds of his curious fellow citizens, under whose very eyes he had lived so long undiscovered."

Starting in 1877, he performed with the American Lilliputian Company. In the 1890s, he toured with Adam Forepaugh's circus.

He married dwarf Lottie Naomi Swartwood on August 14, 1892. They had two children: a daughter Hazel Kahn Golden (1892-1918) and a son Gabriel Kahn (1896-1982). He died of the 1918 influenza pandemic at his home in White Plains, New York on October 28, 1918, aged 59 years.

References

External links
Admiral Dot images

American entertainers
Entertainers with dwarfism
Sideshow performers
19th-century births
Year of birth uncertain
1918 deaths
Deaths from the Spanish flu pandemic in New York (state)
People from San Francisco